Roebling  is an unincorporated community and census-designated place (CDP) located within Florence Township, in Burlington County, New Jersey, United States, that was established as part of the 2010 United States census. As of the 2000 United States census, the CDP was combined as Florence-Roebling, which had a total population of 8,200. As of the 2010 Census, the Florence-Roebling CDP was split into its components, Florence (with a population of 4,426) and Roebling. As of the 2010 Census, the population of the Florence CDP was 4,426.

History
Roebling, site of the Roebling Steel Mill, the Kinkora Works, was founded by Charles Roebling, son of John A. Roebling. John A. Roebling & Sons company built and provided the steel for the Brooklyn Bridge, the Golden Gate Bridge, as well as numerous other bridges including one over Niagara Falls.

The steel mill was also responsible for the production of the elevator cables for the Empire State Building in New York City, the Chicago Board of Trade Building in Chicago and the Washington Monument in Washington, D.C. John A. Roebling & Sons company made the wire for the original slinky as well.

Geography
According to the United States Census Bureau, the CDP had a total area of 1.173 square miles (3.036 km2), including 1.008 square miles (2.610 km2) of land and 0.165 square miles (0.426 km2) of water (14.07%).

Demographics

Historic district

The Roebling Historic District is a  historic district roughly bounded by Roebling Park, South Street, 2nd and 8th Avenues, Roland Street, Alden, Norman Railroad, and Amboy Avenues in the community. It was added to the National Register of Historic Places on May 22, 1978 for its significance in architecture, commerce, industry, community planning, and immigrant experience. The district includes 94 contributing buildings.

Transportation
The River Line offers service to Camden and Trenton Rail Station, with stations in Roebling at Hornberger Avenue and Florence at U.S. Route 130.

New Jersey Transit provides service to and from Philadelphia on the 409.

Notable people

People who were born in, residents of, or otherwise closely associated with Roebling include:
 Heath Fillmyer (born 1994), professional baseball pitcher for the Kansas City Royals.
 Gia Maione (1941–2013), singer who was the wife of singer Louis Prima.
 John A. Roebling, created the steel for the Brooklyn Bridge and the Golden Gate Bridge

See also
 National Register of Historic Places listings in Burlington County, New Jersey

References

External links
 
 
 
 
 
 

Florence Township, New Jersey
Census-designated places in Burlington County, New Jersey
Company towns in New Jersey
Historic American Engineering Record in New Jersey